Victor Arthur Hanson (July 30, 1903 – April 10, 1982) was an American football player and coach, basketball player, and baseball player.  A three-sport college athlete, he played football, basketball, and baseball at Syracuse University in the 1920s, serving as team captain in all three sports.  The Watertown, New York native was named a Basketball All-American three times—in 1925, 1926, and 1927—by the Helms Athletic Foundation and was a consensus selection to the 1926 College Football All-America Team.

Following his college career he played briefly with the Cleveland Rosenblums in the American Basketball League and then formed a basketball team, the Syracuse All-Americans. He was also signed by the New York Yankees of Major League Baseball upon graduation from Syracuse in 1927 and played one year in their farm system.   Hanson served as the head football coach at his alma mater from 1930 to 1936, compiling a record of 33–21–5.  He is only player inducted into both the Naismith Memorial Basketball Hall of Fame and the College Football Hall of Fame.

Head coaching record

References

External links
 Syracuse profile
 
 

1903 births
1982 deaths
All-American college men's basketball players
American football ends
American men's basketball players
Cleveland Rosenblums players
Syracuse Orangemen baseball players
Syracuse Orange football coaches
Syracuse Orange football players
Syracuse Orange men's basketball players
Syracuse Stars (baseball)
All-American college football players
College Football Hall of Fame inductees
National Collegiate Basketball Hall of Fame inductees
Naismith Memorial Basketball Hall of Fame inductees
Manlius Pebble Hill School alumni
Sportspeople from Watertown, New York
Coaches of American football from New York (state)
Players of American football from New York (state)
Basketball players from New York (state)